Ugo Zagato (25 June 1890, in Gavello – 31 October 1968) was an Italian automobile designer, known for establishing and running the Zagato coachbuilder, famous for its lightweight designs.

He had five brothers and lost his father (1905), forcing him to emigrate to Germany and metalworks employment in Köln (1905).  He  returned to serve in the military (1909) and joined car coachbuilder Carrozzeria Varesina in Varese, while studying at the Santa Maria design school.
During World War I he moved to Torino and joined the Pomilio aircraft manufacturer,  learning lightweight body construction (1915–1919).  He established Carrozzeria Ugo Zagato & Co., a workshop in Milan (1919), where he built close ties with Alfa Romeo.
His workshop was destroyed and rebuilt as La Zagato outside Milan after World War II, joined in 1946 by his sons Elio Zagato (1921–2009), and Gianni Zagato  (born 1929).  Ugo's sons continued operations after his passing in 1968.

Awards
Compasso d'Oro 1960 for the Fiat Abarth 1000

References

Italian automobile designers
People from the Province of Rovigo
1890 births
1968 deaths
Alfa Romeo people
Compasso d'Oro Award recipients